Ridgeway is a village in North East Derbyshire in the county of Derbyshire in England.

Location
Ridgeway lies just south of the South Yorkshire border, around 5 miles southeast of Sheffield City Centre. The village is surrounded by a number of hamlets and villages with Highlane to the north, Ford, Bramley and Birley Hay to the south, Plumbley and Mosborough to the east and Troway and Geerlane to the west.

History
It is believed to be around 700 years old, and would once have been part of Sherwood Forest.

It is still a self-contained village, within North East Derbyshire, and is in the Moss Valley Conservation Area.

Ridgeway originally consisted of three smaller settlements- Sloadlane, Ridgeway and Ridgeway Moor. Also, many people amalgamate the nearby villages of Birley Hay, Ford and Highlane with the above settlements, though they do virtually run into one another today.

Ridgeway was once deeply involved in the local industry of sickle and scythe manufacturing, like its neighbouring villages. At one time, it had a large industrial scale scythe manufactury known as the Commonside Sickle Manufactory. It has now been converted into apartments. Similar manufactories could be found at Birley Hey, a hamlet built entirely as of industry, at Highlane, where Hutton & Co that ran the Phoenix Works resided and at Mosborough. Grindstones, likely brought in from Millstone quarries from what was to be the Peak district or Rotherham, stand testament to this old industry, and many can be found literally built into people's houses.

Facilities
Ridgeway has a primary school (Ridgeway Primary School), a church (St John The Evangelist Church, Ridgeway), a Methodist chapel, four pubs (The Bridge Inn, The Swan, The Queen's Head and The Phoenix Inn), sports facilities (football, tennis, bowls, cricket) and a restaurant (The Old Vicarage) that used to hold a Michelin Star

Notable residents
Clinton Woods - IBF Light Heavyweight World Champion.
T.L. Platts - (died 1998) Local historian and author.

See also
Listed buildings in Eckington, Derbyshire

External links
Ridgway Village
Ridgeway Village History
Ridgeway Primary School

Villages in Derbyshire
Eckington, Derbyshire